Graba may refer to:

Carl Julian (von) Graba (1799–1874), German lawyer and ornithologist who visited and studied the Faroe Islands
Jeff Graba (born 1968), American college gymnastics coach
Jerome Clifford Graba (1928–2004), American politician and farmer
Graba' (1940–2016), Belgian artist, who created mainly paintings and jewellery

See also
Erbessa graba, moth of the family Notodontidae
Nunska Graba, settlement in the hills southeast of Ljutomer in northeastern Slovenia
Rinčetova Graba, settlement in the hills southeast of Ljutomer in northeastern Slovenia